Sestrin-2 also known as Hi95 is a protein that in humans is encoded by the SESN2 gene.

Function
This gene encodes a member of the sestrin family of PA26-related proteins. The encoded protein may function in the regulation of cell growth and survival. This protein may be involved in cellular response to different stress conditions. The Sestrins constitute a family of evolutionarily-conserved stress-inducible proteins that suppress oxidative stress and regulate adenosine monophosphate-dependent protein kinase (AMPK)-mammalian target of rapamycin (mTOR) signaling. By virtue of these activities, the Sestrins serve as important regulators of metabolic homeostasis. Accordingly, inactivation of Sestrin genes in invertebrates resulted in diverse metabolic pathologies, including oxidative damage, fat accumulation, mitochondrial dysfunction and muscle degeneration that resemble accelerated tissue aging.

Ligands
The NMDA receptor antagonist ketamine has been found to activate the mammalian target of rapamycin complex 1 (mTORC1) pathway in the medial prefrontal cortex (mPFC) of the brain as an essential downstream mechanism in the mediation of its rapid-acting antidepressant effects. NV-5138 is a ligand and modulator of sestrin2, a leucine amino acid sensor and upstream regulatory pathway of mTORC1, and is under development for the treatment of depression. The drug has been found to directly and selectively activate the mTORC1 pathway, including in the mPFC, and to produce rapid-acting antidepressant effects similar to those of ketamine.

See also
 SESN1

References

Further reading